West Virginia Route 601 is a north–south state highway in the South Charleston, West Virginia area. The southern terminus of the route is at an interchange with U.S. Route 119 south of South Charleston, where the roadway continues as West Virginia Route 214. The northern terminus is at U.S. Route 60 in South Charleston near Interstate 64.

Major intersections

601
Transportation in Kanawha County, West Virginia